Timemaster is a 1995 American film written and directed by James Glickenhaus and starring Jesse Cameron-Glickenhaus, Pat Morita, Joanna Pacula and Duncan Regehr. It also features Michelle Williams in one of her first theatrical roles.

Premise
Young Jesse is the Earth's last line of defense and travels through time trying to stop an alien threat.

Production
Timemaster was written and directed by James Glickenhaus and stars his own son, Jesse Cameron-Glickenhaus. James also wrote some songs for the movie's soundtrack. This was the last film released by Shapiro-Glickenhaus Entertainment, before they disbanded in 1995. Despite being one her earliest roles in a film, Michelle Williams always disowned the movie. She was so embarrassed by her involvement with this picture, to the point that she and some of the people involved with the film decided to call it "Timewaster."

Cast
 Jesse Cameron-Glickenhaus as Jesse Adams
 Pat Morita as Isaiah
 Joanna Pacula as Evelyn Adams
 Duncan Regehr as Jonathan Adams
 Michael Dorn as Chairman
 Michelle Williams as Annie
 Scott Colomby as The Gambler
 Zelda Rubinstein as Betting Clerk
 George Pilgrim as Billy the Kid
 Nils Allen Stewart as Mordor
 Lindsey Ginter as Commando Leader

Reception
The film received overwhelmingly negative reviews.

References

External links
 
 
 Timemaster at Moviefone

1995 films
1990s science fiction films
Films scored by Harry Manfredini
American science fiction films
Films about time travel
Films set in 1996
Films set in 2006
Films set in 2007
Films set in the future
Thanksgiving in films
1990s English-language films
1990s American films